Hugo Pinheiro is a Portuguese bodyboarder.  He placed second at the ISA World Surfing Games in 2006.

References

External links
 

Living people
Year of birth missing (living people)